Aron Bielski (born July 21, 1927), later changed to Aron Bell, is a Polish-American Jew and former member of the Bielski partisans, the largest group of Jewish armed rescuers of Jews during World War II. He was also known as Arczyk Bielski. The youngest of the four Bielski brothers, he is the only one still living (Asael died in 1945, Tuvia in 1987, and Alexander ["Zus"] in 1995).

Life with the Bielski partisans
The Bielski family were farmers in Stankiewicze near Navahrudak in present-day Belarus, an area that at the beginning of the Second World War belonged to the Second Polish Republic. In September 1939, it was seized by the Soviet Union, which was then allied with Nazi Germany. After the Germans launched Operation Barbarossa, the invasion of the Soviet Union, Aron's brothers created a notable resistance organization, the Bielski partisans group, of which Aron became a member.

Nechama Tec, who wrote a book about them, had the following to say about Aron: "Occasionally in the forest he acted as a guide. Those I spoke to agree that his participation and impact on the life of the Bielski otriad [a partisan detachment] was minimal, almost nonexistent." While Nechama was not able to interview Aron, he was interviewed by Peter Duffy in Duffy's book.
That author, in the second authoritative book about the Bielski partisans, mentions Aron about 30 times and lists him as one of the important sources for the book.  Duffy also interviewed Bell for the article "Heroes Among Us" (2000), published in The New York Times.

Later life
After the war, Bielski returned to communist-dominated Poland but soon afterward emigrated to the British Mandate of Palestine. In 1954, he settled in the United States, where he joined his surviving brothers and their families.

Legacy
English actor George MacKay portrayed Aron in the film Defiance (2008). MacKay was then sixteen years old, approximately the same age as was Aron during the period depicted in the film.

References

External links
 Gary Stern, For Pound Ridge man, the new movie "Defiance" is the story of his family, The Journal News, January 21, 2009
 
  Piotr Głuchowski, Marcin Kowalski, Wymazany Aron Bell (Aron Bell Erased), Gazeta Wyborcza, 008-06-16

1927 births
Living people
People from Lida District
Belarusian partisans
Soviet partisans
20th-century Polish Jews
Jewish partisans
Holocaust survivors